The Dean of Christ Church Cathedral, Dublin is the senior official of that church, the cathedral of the United Diocese of Dublin and Glendalough in the Church of Ireland, and head of the Chapter, its governing body. A Dean has presided over Christ Church Cathedral since around 1539, before which the cathedral was a Priory under Augustinian rules, headed by a Prior, back to the time of Archbishop St. Laurence O'Toole. Aspects of the cathedral administration are overseen by the Cathedral Board, which the Dean chairs (with both a regular and a casting vote).

Appointment
The Dean is appointed by the Church of Ireland Archbishop of Dublin.

Priors and Deans of Christ Church Cathedral
The previous holders of the senior office of the Cathedral have been:

Priors
 c.1171-c.1190 – Gervase (Gervasius), first formal record 1177  
 c.1190-c.1196 – Columbanus   
 c.1196-c.1201 – Thomas   
 c.1201-c.1205 – ?
 c.1205-c.1208 – Robert   
 c.1208-c.1220 – W(illiam le Gros?)
 c.1220-c.1225 – Bernard   
 c.1225-c.1235 – Roger   
 c.1235-c.1244 – Philip (de Cruce?)  
 c.1244–1252 – Robert de Stanford  
 1252-c.1265? – John?
There may have been a Robert in office in 1260, and a Fulk around 1262
 c.1265-c.1279 – William de Gran, first formal record 1270  
 c.1279-c.1292 – Adam de la More  
 c.1292-c.1296 – John de Exeter (or de Oxford?) 
 c.1296–1301 – Adam de Balsham, elected  Archbishop of Dublin in 1299 by the Cathedral chapter, while the chapter of St Patrick's Cathedral chose another candidate,  Thomas de Chaddesworth, but both were refused confirmation as Archbishop by the Pope, and forced to stand down in favour of Richard de Ferings. Removed from office 1301.
 1301–1313 – Henry de la War(r)e de Bristol 
 1313–1320 – John Pocock? (or possibly a John Toppe around 1313, and Pocock or Pecock by 1317)
 1320–1326 – Hugh (le Jeune) de Sutton
 1326–1331 – Robert de Gloucester  
 1331–1337 – Roger Goioun  
 1337–1343 – Gilbert de Bolyniop  
 1343–1346 – Simon de Ludegate  
 1346–1349 – Robert de Hereforde  
 1349–1382 – Stephen de Derby  
 1382–1397 – Robert Lokynton, first formal record 1388  
 1397–1409 – James de Redenesse  
 1409–1438 – Nicholas Staunton  
 1438–1459 – William Denys, first formal record 1443  
 1459–1474 – William Lynton, first formal record 1463  
 1474–1489 – Thomas Harrold  
 1489–1499 – David Wynchester (or Winchester) 
 1499–1519 – Richard Skyrrett  
 1519–1537 – William Hassard  
 1537–1539 – Robert Castle or Castell (alias Paynswick or Painswick)

Deans
The Reformation having reached Ireland, by Royal Warrant of December 12, 1539, the Prior and Canons of Holy Trinity were transformed into secular clergy, to be known as the Dean and Chapter of Christ Church. So, Robert Paynswick or Penswick, alias Castell, Prior, and Richard Ball, Sub-Prior, became Dean and Precentor respectively, whilst Walter White, Seneschal and Precentor, became Chancellor and Vicar-Choral, and John Moss, Sub-Precentor [Succentor] and Sacristan, Treasurer and Vicar-Choral of the new foundation. Thus the last Augustinian Prior (Robert Paynswick) became the first Dean of Christ Church, though the process of conversion actually continued in 1540 and 1542, finishing with a Chapter of eight clergy.
 1539–1543 – Robert Paynswick  
 1543–1565 – Thomas Lockwood, previously Archdeacon of Meath
 1565–1595 – John Garvey (afterwards Bishop of Kilmore, 1585 retaining Christ Church deanery in commendam ) 
 1595–1618 – Jonas (James) Wheeler  (afterwards Bishop of Ossory, 1613 retaining Christ Church deanery in commendam)
 1618–1634 – Randolph Barlow (afterwards Archbishop of Tuam, 1629 retaining Christ Church deanery in commendam)
 1634–1639 – Henry Tilson  (afterwards Bishop of Elphin, 1639)
 1639–1644 – James Margetson (afterwards Archbishop of Dublin, 1660)  
 1644–1644 – Patrick Cahill  
 1644–1661 – William Berrey  
 1661–1666 – Robert Mossom  (afterwards Bishop of Derry, 1666)
 1666–1677 – John Parry (afterwards Bishop of Ossory, 1672)
 1677–1688 – William Moreton (afterwards Bishop of Kildare, 1682)
 1688–1691 – Alexius Stafford 
 1691–1705 – William Moreton (also Bishop of Kildare)
From this time the offices of Bishop of Kildare (endowment of 150 pounds yearly) and Dean of Christ Church (endowment of 5200 pounds annually) were held in commendam (by the one person, taken up at the same time, starting in 1688), until the union with St. Patrick's.  
 1705–1731 – Welbore Ellis (also Bishop of Kildare) (afterwards Bishop of Meath, 1732)
 1731–1743 – Charles Cobbe  (also Bishop of Kildare) (afterwards Archbishop of Dublin, 1743)
 1743–1745 – George Stone (also Bishop of Kildare) (afterwards Bishop of Derry, 1745)
 1745–1761 – Thomas Fletcher  (also Bishop of Kildare)
 1761–1765 – Richard Robinson, 1st Baron Rokeby (also Bishop of Kildare) 
 1765–1790 – Charles Jackson  (also Bishop of Kildare)
 1790–1804 – George Lewis Jones (also Bishop of Kildare)
 1804–1846 – Charles Dalrymple Lindsay (also Bishop of Kildare)
In 1846, the Diocese of Kildare was united to that of Dublin, and, until 1871, the office of Dean of Christ Church was united to that of Dean of St. Patrick's.
 1846–1864 – Henry Pakenham, ( also Dean of St Patrick's Cathedral, 1843-1863)
 1864–1872 – John West (also Dean of St Patrick's Cathedral, 1864-1889)
 1872–1884 – Richard Chenevix Trench (also Archbishop of Dublin, 1863-1884)
 1884–1887 – William Plunket, 4th Baron Plunket (also Archbishop of Dublin, 1884-1897)
 1887–1908 – William C. Greene, Canon 
 1908–1918 – James Hornidge Walsh, previously Rector of St. Stephen's, and Canon from 1893 
 1918–1921 – Harry Vere White 
 1921–1938 – Herbert Brownlow Kennedy 
 1938–1962 – Ernest Henry Cornwall Lewis-Crosby
 1962–1966 – Norman David Emerson 
 1967–1989 – Thomas Noel Desmond Cornwall Salmon 
 1989–2004 – John Thomas Farquhar Paterson, previously Vicar of St Bartholomew's Church, Dublin and Dean of St Brigid's Cathedral Kildare, died 2005
 2004–2007 – Robert Desmond Harman
 2008–present – Dermot Patrick Martin Dunne, previously Archdeacon of Ferns.

See also
 Deans of St. Patrick's Cathedral, Dublin

Sources
Mervyn Archdall, Monasticon Hibernicum, ed. Patrick F. Moran (2 vols, Dublin, W.B. Kelly, 1873), ii, 15-16, 'A List of Deans of Christ Church'.
 William Butler, The cathedral church of the Holy Trinity Dublin (Christ Church): a description of its fabric, and a brief history of the foundation, and subsequent changes (London, 1901), Appendix: 'List of priors and deans 1170-1901' 
 Poster headed Cathedral of Dublin: the ancient priory church of the holy Trinity commonly called Christ Church (Dublin, 1908)
 J. B. Leslie, 'Fasti of Christ Church cathedral, Dublin' (Representative Church Body Library, Mississippi 61/2/2 [n.d., c.1939]), 56-71.
 G. J. Hand, 'The two cathedrals of Dublin: internal organisation and mutual relations, to the middle of the fourteenth century' (M.A. and Travelling Studentship in History thesis, National University of Ireland, 1954), 147-9.
 [Stuart Kinsella,] 'Priors and deans' in Kenneth Milne (ed.), Christ Church cathedral Dublin: a history (Dublin: Four Courts Press, 2000), 391-2.
 Church of Ireland Church of Ireland website (August 2007).

 
Christ Church Cathedral, Dublin
Dublin, Christ Church
1539 establishments in Ireland